Tommy Lefroy is an international indie pop musical duo currently based in London, England, consisting of Canadian singer Tessa Mouzourakis and American singer Wynter Bethel. They are most noted as Juno Award nominees for Breakthrough Group of the Year at the Juno Awards of 2023.

The duo first met in Nashville, Tennessee in 2017, where both were trying to establish themselves as professional songwriters. They began to work together as a duo in 2018 after Bethel was exposed to Mouzourakis's online cover of boygenius's "Ketchum, ID", taking the name Tommy Lefroy in reference to Thomas Langlois Lefroy, an Irish politician who is thought to be an inspiration for the character of Mr. Darcy in Jane Austen's novel Pride and Prejudice.

After collaborating on songwriting and learning record production, they began releasing singles in 2021, breaking through to wider success when their single "The Cause" became popular on TikTok.

They released their debut EP Flight Risk in November 2021. They signed to Pheromone Recordings in 2022, and put out the non-album single "Dog Eat Dog" as their first release for the label.

References

American indie pop groups
Canadian indie pop groups
British indie pop groups
American musical duos
Canadian musical duos
British musical duos
Musical groups established in 2018